The Jebtsundamba Khutuktu are the spiritual heads of the Gelug lineage of Tibetan Buddhism in Mongolia. They also hold the title of Bogd Gegeen, making them the top-ranked lamas in Mongolia.

History 

The first Jebtsundamba, Zanabazar (1635–1723), was identified as the reincarnation of the scholar Taranatha of the Jonang school of Tibetan Buddhism. Zanabazar was the son of the Tüsheet Khan Gombodorj, ruler of central Khalkha Mongolia, and himself became the spiritual head of the Khalkha Mongols.

On May 29, the Jebtsundamba Khutukhtu paid homage to the Kangxi Emperor in 1691 at Dolonnor.

Like Zanabazar, the 2nd Jebtsundamba Khutughtu was a member of Mongolia's highest nobility and direct descendant of Genghis Khan. After Chingünjav's rebellion and the demise of the second Jebtsundamba Khutugtu, the Qianlong Emperor decreed in 1758 that all future reincarnations were to be found from among the population of Tibet.

When northern Mongolia declared independence in 1911, the eighth Jebtsundamba (1869–1924) was elevated to theocratic ruler, called Bogd Khan. He was the head of state until his death in 1924. The communist government of the Mongolian People's Republic, which replaced the theocracy in 1924, declared that there were to be no further reincarnations.

A reincarnation was in fact found almost at once in north Mongolia, and some high lamas of the dead Khutughtu's suite went to interview the child's mother, Tsendjav, and to instruct her in the details of the life of the former incarnation, so that she could familiarize the child-candidate with the tests which he would have to undergo. Faced with the possibility of a new Khutughtu who was born within Mongolia and was not even a foreigner from Tibet, the Central Committee of the Mongolian People's Revolutionary Party decided in July 1925 to turn the matter over to the elderly 13th Dalai Lama in Lhasa. The Dalai Lama's decision would nonetheless be subject to new Mongolian legislation for the separation of church and state. In February 1929, the installation of any further Khutughtus was forbidden.

A 9th Jebtsundamba Khutughtu was installed by the 14th Dalai Lama as the head of a reinvigorated Jonang lineage. He was born Jampal Namdol Chökyi Gyaltsen in 1932 and he died in early 2012. Despite the Chinese government's claim to have inherited the authority and ultimate decision right for the choice of successor of all high lamas in Mongolia and Tibet, the 9th Jebstundamba will be reincarnated within the independent Mongolia and the selection will be confirmed by the Dalai Lama. This puts China in a dilemma of endangering their foreign affairs with Mongolia for the choice of the next Lama or to forfeit this right that they claim to have control of religious affairs, ultimately giving up their authority over the choice of the next Dalai Lama and putting their current choice of the Panchen Lama in question.

List of Jebtsundamba Khutuktus 

Bogdo gegeen (Mongolian and ceremonial Tibetan language names)
1635–1723: Öndör Gegeen Zanabazar, 1st Jebtsundamba Khutughtu
1724–1757: Luvsandambiydonmi, 2nd Jebtsundamba Khutughtu
1758–1773: Ishdambiynyam, 3rd Jebtsundamba Khutughtu
1775–1813: Luvsantüvdenvanchug, 4th Jebtsundamba Khutughtu
1815–1841: Luvsanchültimjigmed, 5th Jebtsundamba Khutughtu
1843–1848: Luvsantüvdenchoyjijaltsan, 6th Jebtsundamba Khutughtu
1850–1868: Agvaanchoyjivanchugperenlaijamts, 7th Jebtsundamba Khutughtu
1870–20 May 1924: Agvaanluvsanchoyjindanzanvaanchigbalsambuu, 8th Jebtsundamba Khutughtu and Bogd Khan
1936–1 March 2012: Jambalnamdolchoyjijantsan (Jampal Namdrol Chokye Gyeltsen), 9th Jebtsundamba Khutughtu (b. 1933; from 1991, recognized by the Dalai Lama; exile in Tibet to 1959, then in India; died in Ulaanbaatar)
On November 23, 2016 during a visit to Mongolia, the Dalai Lama announced his belief that the 10th Jebtsundamba Khutughtu had been reborn in Mongolia and that a process for identifying him had begun.
On March 8, 2023 at a ceremony in Dharamsala, the Dalai Lama announced the presence at the ceremony of the 10th Jebtsundamba Khutuktu.

Notes

References

External links
 The Zanabazar quadratic script, Ragchaagiin Byambaa
Online biography of Zanabazar, the first Khalkha Jebtsundamba
List of the first eight Jebtsundamba Khutuktus (in Mongolian)

Gelug Buddhists
Tulkus